CSS Texas is the name of two ships in the Confederate States Navy:

, a steam commerce raider better known as the Spanish screw corvette Tornado
, an ironclad ram unfinished at the end of the war

Ships of the Confederate States Navy